Ściborzyce  is a village located in the Lesser Poland Voivodeship, Olkusz County, Trzyciąż Commune in Poland.

References

Villages in Olkusz County